The Locus Awards are an annual set of literary awards voted on by readers of the science fiction and fantasy magazine Locus, a monthly magazine based in Oakland, California. The awards are presented at an annual banquet. In addition to the plaques awarded to the winners, publishers of winning works are honored with certificates, which is unique in the field.

Originally a poll of Locus subscribers only, voting is now open to anyone, but the votes of subscribers count twice as much as the votes of non-subscribers. The award was inaugurated in 1971, and was originally intended to provide suggestions and recommendations for the Hugo Awards. They have come to be considered a prestigious prize in science fiction, fantasy and horror literature. The Encyclopedia of Science Fiction regards the Locus Awards as sharing the reputation of the Hugo and Nebula Awards. 

Gardner Dozois holds the record for the most wins (43), while Neil Gaiman has won the most awards for works of fiction (18). Robert Silverberg has received the  highest number of nominations (158).

Frequently nominated 
As of the 2021 awards, the following have had the most nominations:

Categories
Locus Award for Best Novel (discontinued)
Locus Award for Best Science Fiction Novel
Locus Award for Best Fantasy Novel
Locus Award for Best Horror Novel (1989–90, 1994)
Also known as:
Locus Award for Best Horror/Dark Fantasy Novel (1991–93, 1996–97)
Locus Award for Best Dark Fantasy/Horror Novel (1995, 1999)
Locus Award for Best First Novel
Locus Award for Best Young Adult Book
Locus Award for Best Novella
Locus Award for Best Novelette
Locus Award for Best Short Story
Originally known as:
Locus Award for Best Short Fiction (1971–74, 1978)
Locus Award for Best Magazine
Locus Award for Best Publisher
Locus Award for Best Anthology
Locus Award for Best Collection
Locus Award for Best Editor
Locus Award for Best Artist
Locus Award for Best Non-fiction/Art Book

Inactive categories
There are several categories that no longer receive Locus Awards:

Locus Award for Best Original Anthology (1972–1975)
1972: Universe 1 edited by Terry Carr
1973: Again, Dangerous Visions edited by Harlan Ellison
1974: Astounding edited by Harry Harrison
1975: Universe 4 edited by Terry Carr
Locus Award for Best Reprint Anthology/Collection (1972–1975)
1972: World's Best Science Fiction: 1971 edited by Donald A. Wollheim and Terry Carr
1973: The Best Science Fiction of the Year #2 edited by Terry Carr
1974: The Best Science Fiction of the Year #2 edited by Terry Carr
1975: Before the Golden Age edited by Isaac Asimov
Locus Award for Best Fanzine (1971–1977)
1971: Locus
1972: Locus
1973: Locus
1974: Locus
1975: Outworlds
1976: Locus
1977: Locus
Locus Award for Best Single Fanzine Issue (1971)
1971: Locus
Locus Award for Best Critic (1974–1977)
1974: Richard Geis
1975: P. Schuyler Miller
1976: Richard Geis
1977: Spider Robinson
Locus Award for Best Fan Writer (1971–1973)
1971: Harry Warner, Jr.
1972: Charlie Brown
1973: Terry Carr
Locus Award for Best Fan Critic (1971)
1971: Ted Pauls
Locus Award for Best Publisher - Hardcover (1975–1976)
1975: Science Fiction Book Club
1976: Science Fiction Book Club
Locus Award for Best Publisher - Paperback (1975–1976)
1975: Ballantine
1976: Ballantine
Locus Award for Best Paperback Cover Artist (1971–1973)
1971: Leo & Diane Dillon
1972: Gene Szafran
1973: Frank Kelly Freas
Locus Award for Best Magazine Artist (1972–1973)
1972: Frank Kelly Freas
1973: Frank Kelly Freas
Locus Award for Best Fan Artist (1971–1975)
1971: Alicia Austin
1972: Bill Rotsler
1973: Bill Rotsler
1974: Tim Kirk
1975: Tim Kirk
Locus Award for Best Fan Cartoonist (1971)
1971: Bill Rotsler
Locus Award for Best Convention (1971)
1971: Noreascon

References

External links
 Excerpts and synopses for Locus winning and nominated novels

American literary awards
L
Science fiction awards
Fantasy awards
Horror fiction awards
Culture of Oakland, California
Award
Awards established in 1970
1970 establishments in California
Magazine awards
Anthology awards
Short story collection awards